Radha-Krishna (IAST) are collectively known within Hinduism as the combined forms of feminine as well as the masculine realities of God. Krishna and Radha are the primeval forms of God and his pleasure potency (Hladini Shakti), respectively, in several Vaishnavite schools of thought.

In Krishnaite traditions of Vaishnavism, Krishna is referred to as Svayam Bhagavan  and Radha is illustrated as the primeval potency of the three main potencies of God, Hladini (immense spiritual bliss), Sandhini (eternality) and Samvit (existential consciousness) of which Radha is an embodiment of the feeling of love towards the almighty Lord Krishna (Hladini).

With Krishna, Radha is acknowledged as the Supreme Goddess. It is said that Krishna is only satiated by devotional service in loving servitude and Radha is the personification of devotional service to the supreme lord. Various devotees worship her with the understanding of her merciful nature as the only way to attain Krishna. Radha is also depicted to be Krishna himself, split into two, for the purpose of his enjoyment. As per Hindu scriptures, Radha is considered as the complete incarnation of Mahalakshmi.

It is believed that Krishna enchants the world, but Radha enchants even him. Therefore, she is the supreme goddess of all and together they are called as Radha-Krishna. In many Vaishnava sections, Radha Krishna are often identified as the avatars of Lakshmi Narayan.

Names

Vigneshwara cannot be broken into two – Krishna (Devanagari: कृष्ण), the eighth incarnation (Avatar) of Vishnu, and his shakti Radha (Devanagari: राधा) such was the love of Radha towards Krishna that they are one. Krishna in Vrindavana is depicted with Radha standing on his left. Some important names of Radha and Krishna mentioned in scriptures are:

 Names of Radha - Radhika, Radhe, Madhavi, Keshavi, Shyama, Shreeji, Gopika, Kishori, Laadli ji, Radharani, Gaurangi, Madan Mohini, Nitya, Shubhangi, Aparajita, Raseshwari, Brajeshwari, Vrindavaneshwari, Golokeshwari, Krishna Priya, Krishna Kaanta, Krishna Samyukta, KrishnaVallabha, Krishna Stuta, and Krishneshwari.

 Names of Krishna - Kanha, Madhav, Keshav, Shyam, Gopinath, Kishore, Gaurang, Madan Mohan, Gopal, Kanhaiya, Madhusudan, Hari, Damodar, Murlidhar, Govinda, Raseshwar, Brajeshwar, Vrindavaneshwar, Golokeshwar, RadhaRaman, RadhaVallabh, Radhanath, RadhaKaant, and Radheshwar.

Literature

Radha Krishna's first literary mention was found in King Hala's Prakrit text Gatha Saptasati which is composed of 700 verses and was written in the 1st century CE. Later, The popular Gita Govinda written by Jayadeva in 12th century CE widely depicted Radha and Krishna as a couple. According to scriptures like Brahma Vaivarta Purana and Garga Samhita, Radha-Krishna are the supreme deities. Content of both the scriptures are majorly based on the divine pastimes of Radha Krishna in Vrindavan and Goloka. The other relevant texts mentioning Radha Krishna are the Radhopnishad of Rig Veda, Radhatapani Upanishad of Atharva Veda, Shiva Purana, Brahmanda Purana, Skanda Purana, Padma Purana, Matsya Purana, Devi-Bhagavata Purana, Narada Pancharatra and Brahma samhita. Goddess Radha is also indirectly mentioned in Bhagavata Purana of Sukadeva Goswami along with Lord Krishna under many different names like "Aradhika" and "Gopi". Adi Shankracharya who happened way before Jayadeva also mentioned Goddess Radha in his work called "Achyuta Ashtakam" which is dedicated to Achyuta form of Lord Krishna.

The devotional works of Jayadeva, Nimbarkacharya, Rasik saints like Chaitanya Mahaprabhu along with his six disciple goswamis, Bhakti poet-saints Narsinh Mehta, Vidyapati, Chandidas, Meera Bai, Surdas, Swami Haridas and many more played pivotal role in enlighting society about goddess Radha who is believed to be the feminine form of Krishna himself. 
According to several Hindu denominations including Gaudiya Vaishnavism, Nimbarka Sampradaya, Pushtimarg, and Swaminarayan Sampradaya, it is believed that Radha is not just one cowherd maiden, but the origin of all the gopis, or divine personalities that participate in the rasa dance. They are also mentioned in Gopala Tapani Upanishad, Chaitanya Charitamrita and Gita Govinda.

Shakti and Shaktiman

The common derivation of shakti and shaktiman, i.e. female and male principle in a god implies that shakti and shaktiman are the same. Each and every god has its partner, or Shakti, and without this Shakti, is sometimes viewed being without essential power. It is a not uncommon feature of Hinduism when worship of a pair rather than one personality constitutes worship of God, such is worship of Radha Krishna. Traditions worshiping Krishna, as svayam bhagavan, who is male, include reference and veneration to his Radha, who is worshiped as supreme. A view that exists of orthodox Krishnaism, the sect of the worship of Krishna, is that Radha is shakti and Krishna is shaktiman and are always found without any tinge of materialistic attributes or cause.

Theology and philosophy

From the Vaishnava point of view the divine feminine energy (shakti) implies a divine source of energy, God or shaktiman. "Sita relates to Rama; Lakshmi belongs to Narayana; Radha has her Krishna." As Krishna is believed to be the source of all manifestations of God, "Radha, his consort, is the original source of all shaktis" or feminine manifestation of divine energy.

The first theologo-philosophical justification for worshiping Radha-Krishna was given by Nimbarkacharya, a founder of the Nimbarka Sampradaya in 12th or 13th century CE. In accordance with the Sahitya Akademi Encyclopaedia, he more than any other acharyas gave Radha a place as a deity.

A number of interpretations according to traditions possess a common root of personalism in the understanding of worship. Specifically Caitanyaite Gaudiya Vaishnava doctrine and mission is fiercely "personalistic," proclaiming the supremacy of Krishna, the identification of Caitanya as Radha-Krishna, the reality and eternality of individual selves, and a method for approaching the absolute reality and the Deity as a person first and foremost.

Jiva Goswami in his Priti Sandarbha states that each of the Gopis exhibits a different level of intensity of passion, among which Radha's is the greatest.

In his famous dialogs Ramananda Raya describes Radha to Caitanya and quotes, among other texts, a verse from Chaitanya Charitamrta 2.8.100, before he goes on to describe her role in the pastimes of Vrindavana.

The central pivot point of the theology is related to the word rasa. The theological use of the word can be found very early, about two thousand years before the Nimbarka or Caitanya school, in a phrase that the tradition frequently quotes: "Truly, the Lord is rasa" (raso vai sah) of Brahma sutras. This statement expresses the view that God is the one who enjoys the ultimate rasa or spiritual rapture, emotions.

In traditions

Radha Krishna are worshiped in the following Hindu denominations:

Bhagavata

In Vedic and Puranic literature, Radhas and other forms of the root Radh have meaning of ‘perfection’, ‘success’ and even ‘wealth’. Lord of Success, Indra was referred to as Radhaspati. In references to Mahavishnu as the Lord of Fortune and freely used by Jayadeva as Jaya Jayadeva Hare – the victorious Hari, and ‘Radhaspati’ all found in many places. The word Radha occurs in the Atharva Veda, Taittiriya Brahmana and Taittiriya Samhita.

Charlotte Vaudeville, in the article Evolution of Love Symbolism in Bhagavatism draws some parallel to Nappinnai, appearing in Godha's magnum opus Thiruppavai and in Nammalwar's references to Nappinnani, the daughter-in-law of Nandagopa. Nappinnai is believed to be the source of Radha's conception in Prakrit and Sanskrit literature although their characteristic relations with Krishna are different. In the ritual dance called Kuravai, Krishna dances with his wife Nappinnai. "It is a complex relationship, for the devotee is the ‘same as and yet different from’ the Lord, and so even in the joy of union there is the pain of separation. Indeed, the highest form of devotion, according to Yamunacarya, comes not in union but after the union, in the ‘fear of new separation’."

Yasastilaka Champukavya (959 CE) all make references to Radha and Krishna well before Jayadeva's period. There are elaborate references to Radha in Brahma vaivarta and Padma Puranas.

Gaudiya Vaishnava Sampradaya

Gaudiya Vaishnava, as the name suggests, usually refers to the region of Bengal. Early Bengali literature gives a vivid description of the depiction and evolution of understanding of Radha and Krishna.

In this Bengali tradition metaphysical status and Radha-worship is considered to be established by Krsnadasa in his Chaitanya Charitamrta where he represents the doctrine that prevailed among the Vrindavan Caitanyaites following Caitanya's demise in 1533. It is believed that Krishna, desiring to experience fully what it is like to love Krishna as Radha does, has appeared as Caitanya Mahaprabhu. And what Radha (appearing as Caitanya) does in her longing for Krishna is to chant his names.
One of the self manifested Deities established by Gopala Bhatta Goswami is called Radha Ramana, it is not surprising that Radha Ramana is seen as not only Krishna but also as Radha-Krishna. And worship in his temple, located in the centre of Vrindavana is a perpetual daily affair, involving several prescribed events throughout the day, with the goal of being theoretical and remote, but with aspiration of the possibility to attend and associate directly with Radha and Krishna.

The Manipuri Vaishnavism is a regional variant of Gaudiya Vaishnavism with a culture-forming role among the Meitei people in the north-eastern Indian state of Manipur. There, after a short period of Ramaism penetration, Gaudiya Vaishnavism spread in the early 18th century, especially from beginning its second quarter. Raja Gharib Nawaz (Pamheiba) under the influence of Natottama Thakura's disciples was initiated into the Chaitanya tradition with worship of Radha-Krishna as the supreme deity. Every village there has a Thakur-ghat and a temple. Manipuri Raas Leela and other dances are a feature of the regional folk and religious tradition and often, for example, a female dancer will portray both Krishna and his consort, Radha, in the same piece.

Nimbarka Sampradaya

The Nimbarka Sampradaya worship the youthful form of Krishna, alone or with his consort Radha, is one of the earliest dating at least to the 12th century CE, just as Rudra Sampradaya does. According to Nimbarkacharya, a founder of the sampradaya, Radha is the eternal consort of Vishnu-Krishna and there is also a suggestion, though not a clear statement, that she became the wife of her beloved Krishna. Nimbarka rescues Radha from the presumed immoral implication of much of the literature, and gives to her a dignity unattained elsewhere.

The Nimbarka Sampradaya is one of the four bona fide Vaishnavite traditions. Lack of evidence due to the destruction of Mathura and Vrindavan in the 13th century and 14th century has meant that the true dates and origins of this tradition are shrouded in mystery and await investigation.

Nimbarka, who is widely held by scholars such as Satyanand Joseph, Prof. Rasik Bihari Joshi, Prof. M. M. Aggrawal etc., to be at least of the same time or before the appearance of Shankaracharya, was the first acharya to worship Radha along with Krishna in Sakhi Bhava Upasana method of worship. In his Vedanta Kamadhenu Dashashloki (verse 6), it is clearly stated that:

This theme was taken up by Jayadeva Goswami and other poets of the time who saw the inherent beauty and bliss which constitute this philosophy. In his Gita Govinda Krishna speaks to Radha:

It is believed, however, that the source of Jayadeva's heroine in his poem remains a puzzle of the Sanskrit Literature. At the same time there are well documented references to works earlier than Gita Govinda, which some count to be more than twenty. The figure of Radha is one of the most elusive in the literature of Sanskrit; she is described only in a few selected passages of Prakrit or Sanskrit poetry, a few inscriptions and a few works on grammar, poetry and drama. Jayadeva has referred to them and created an exquisite lyrical poem of passionate devotion in the 12th century CE, and from this poetic beginning a huge movement specific to Bengal began.

In this sampradaya, the significance of Radha is not less than the significance of Sri Krsna. Both are conjointly the object to be worshiped in this school of Nimbarka, who is also one of the first commentators on Brahma Sutras under the name Vedanta-Parijata-Saurabha. The later acharyas of the Nimbarka Sampradaya in the 13th and 14th centuries in Vrindavana composed much literature on the Divine Couple. Swami Sri Sribhatta, the elder god-brother of Jayadeva composed the Yugala Shataka for the Dhrupada style of musical presentation like Jayadeva, however unlike Jayadeva who composed his work in Sanskrit, Swami Shribhatta's compositions are in Vraja language, a Hindi vernacular which was understood by all inhabitants of Vraja. Indeed, the rest of the acharyas of this tradition wrote in Vraja language and due to the lack of prevalence of this language in modern times, very little research has been done, even though these Acharyas predate the Six Goswamis of Vrindavan by centuries. Rare exception was Vijay Ramnarace's PhD thesis in 2014.

In any case, the sole object of worship in the Nimbarka Sampradaya is the unified Divine Couple of Shri Radha Krishna. According to the 15th century Mahavani written by Jagadguru Swami Sri Harivyasa Devacharya -

"radhaamkrsnasvaroopaam vai, krishnam raadhaasvarupinam; kalaatmaanam nikunjastham gururoopam sadaa bhaje"

which means "I ceaselessly praise Radha who is none other than Krishna, and Sri Krishna who is none other than Radha, whose unity is represented by the Kaamabeeja and who are forever resident in Nikunja Goloka Vrindavana."

The contribution from the Nimbarka Sampradaya to the philosophy of Radha Krishna is undeniable, as the philosophy and theology originate in it.

Pranami Sampradaya

The Pranami Sampradaya (Pranami Panth) emerged in the 17th century in Gujarat, based on the Radha-Krishna-focussed syncretic Hindu-Islamic teachings of Devchandra Maharaj and his famous successor, Mahamati Prannath.

Pushtimarg Sampradaya

Vallabhacharya, founder of Pushtimarg tradition even before Chaitanya, worshipped Radha, where according to some sects, the devotees identify mainly with the female companion (sakhis) of Radha who are privileged to arrange intimate pastimes for RadhaKrishna.

One of the prominent poets of this tradition, which also called Radhavallabhi, named Dhruvadasa was notable for being principally concerned with the private relationships of Radha and Krishna. In his poetry Caurasi Pad and in the commentaries of his followers, the concentration is in meditation on the unique benefits of constant reflection on the eternal lila.

Radhavallabhis share with their Vaishnava co-religionists a great regard for Bhagavata Purana, but some of the pastimes that are outside the scope of relationships with Radha and gopis do not feature in the concept of this school. Emphasis is placed on the sweetness of the relationship, or rasa.

Radha Vallabh Sampradaya

The Radha-centered Radha Vallabh Sampradaya founded by Hith Harivansh Mahaprabhu in the 16th century occupies a special position among other traditions. In its theology, Radha is worshiped as the supreme deity, and Krishna is in a subordinate position.

Swaminarayan Sampradaya
Radha-Krishna Dev has a special place in the Swaminarayan Sampraday as Swaminarayan himself referred to Radha Krishna in the Shikshapatri he wrote. Further, he himself ordered the construction of temples in which Radha Krishna have been installed as deities. Swaminarayan "explained that Krishna appears in many forms. When he is together with Radha, he is regarded as supreme lord under the name of Radha-Krishna; with Rukmini he is known as Lakshmi-Narayana." The first temple constructed in the sect, built in Ahmedabad in 1822, houses the images of Nara Narayana, forms of Arjuna and Krishna, in the central shrine. The shrine on the left of the hall has murtis of Radha Krishna. According to the philosophy of the tradition there were many female companions of Krishna, gopis, but out of all of them Radha was considered to be the perfect devotee. Those who wish to come close to Krishna must cultivate the devotional qualities of Radha. According to theory the sect has set aside Goloka as the supreme heaven or abode (in fact, in some of their temples, such as the Mumbai Temple, the murtis installed are those of Shri Gaulokvihari and Radhikaji), because there Krishna is supposed to be enjoying himself with his Gopis, who according to the Swaminarayana sampradaya the milkmaids with whom Krishna danced; his relations with them symbolize the relation of God with the devotee in reciprocation.

Vaishnava-Sahajiya

Since the 15th century CE in Bengal and Assam flourished Tantric Vaishnava-Sahajiya tradition inspired by Bengali spiritual poet Chandidas, where Krishna is the inner divine aspect of man and Radha is the aspect of woman.

The date of Chandidas poem Srikrsnakirtana is still under question however the text remains one of the most important evidences of early portrayal of the popular story of "Lord Krishna's love for the cowherd girl Radha" in Bengali literature and religion. The 412 songs of Srikrsnakirtana are divided into thirteen sections that represent the core of the Radha-Krishna legendary cycle,
with many variants providing excellent comparative material. The manuscript clearly suggests that the songs were meant to be song, and implies particular ragas for the recitation. There is considerable debate as to the authenticity of the text that has significant religious meaning.

Warkari Tradition 
In Warkari tradition which is majorly based in the region of Maharashtra, Radha and Krishna are often venerated in their regional forms of Rahi and Vithoba, also called Vithala. According to the local legends, Rahi (Radha) is the wife of Vithala (Krishna).

Outside Hinduism

Outside Hinduism, Radha and Krishna are mentioned in the scriptures and commentaries of Jainism and Sikhism.
 
Guru Gobind Singh, in his Dasam Grantha, describes Radha the, sukl bhis rika, thus : "Radhika went out in the light of the white soft moon, wearing a white robe to meet her Lord. It was white everywhere and hidden in it, she appeared like the light itself in search of Him".

In many Jain commentaries including the popular Venisamhara by Narayana Bhatta and Dhvanyaloka by Anandavardhana written in 7th century Radha and Krishna are mentioned. Jain scholars like Somadeva Suri and Vikram Bhatta continued mentioning Radha-Krishna between 9th-12th century in their literary works.

Temples

In India

Temples of Shri Radha Krishna are prevalent throughout India and the world. However, Braj region including Vrindavan, Barsana, Gokul, Nandgaon, and Mathura are considered to be the centers of Radha Krishna worship. Some of the important temples of Radha Krishna in Braj region are -

In Vrindavan — Shri Radha Madan Mohan temple, Shri Govind Dev ji temple, Shri Radha Raman temple, Shri Radha Gokulananda temple, Shri Radha Damodar temple, Shri Bankey Bihari temple, Shri Jugal Kishore temple, Shri Radha Gopinath temple, Shri Radha Shyamasundar temple, Prem Mandir, Shahji temple, Krishna Balram Mandir (Iskcon temple), Nidhivan temple, Seva Kunj temple, Shri Radha Vallabh temple, Kusum Sarovar, Radha Kund, Pagal Baba temple, Shri Radha Raas Bihari Ashtsakhi Temple, Priyakant ji temple, and Shri Vrindavan Chandrodaya temple.

In Mathura - Shri Krishna Janambhoomi temple and Shri Dwarkadheesh temple

In Barsana - Shri Radha Rani Temple (Shreeji temple), Rangeeli Mahal (Kirti Mandir), Shri Maan Mandir (Maan Garh)

In Nandgaon - Shri NandBaba temple

In Gokul - Shri Nand Yashoda Bhawan, Raman Reti temple

In Bhandirvan - Shri Radha Krishna Vivah Sthali

Some other important Radha Krishna temples across India are - Shri Radha Govind Dev ji temple in Jaipur, Lalji Temple in Kalna, Hare Krishna Golden Temple in Hyderabad, Murlidhar Krishna Temple in Naggar, Shri Govindajee temple in Imphal, Madan Mohan temple in Karauli, Mayapur Chandrodaya Mandir in Nadia, Swaminarayan temple Gadhada in Botad, Swaminarayan temple Vadtal in Kheda, Iskcon Bangalore, Iskcon Chennai, Iskcon Delhi, Radha Damodar Temple, Junagadh, Bhakti Mandir Mangarh, Swaminarayan temple Mumbai, Iskcon temple Mumbai, Iskcon temple Ujjain, Swaminarayan temple Bhuj, Iskcon temple Patna, Swaminarayan temple Dholera near Ahmedabad, Radha Krishna temple of Baroh in Kangra, historical temples in Bishnupur of Bankura district including Rasmancha, RadheShyam temple, Jor Bangla, and Radha Madhab Temple.

Outside India

There are number of traditions that spread the worship of Radha Krishna across world, be it associated with migration or preaching activities of sadhus.
There are around 850 Iskcon temples spread across the world which promotes the worship of Radha Krishna. Similarly, Swaminarayan Sampradaya has also established many temples outside India in which Radha Krishna Dev are worshipped. Radha Madhav Dham in Austin, Texas built by Jagadguru Kripalu Parishat is one of the biggest Radha Krishna temple in Western hemisphere.

Popular songs and prayers
The Shri Radhika Krishnastaka (also called the Radhashtak) is a hymn. It is said that the reciter can get to Krishna via Radha by chanting it. The other popular songs and prayers include — Yugalashtakam written by Jiva Goswami which glorifies the love and inseparability of the divine couple Radha Krishna and Jayadeva's much acclaimed work Gita Govinda which was written in the 12th century and is still the part of temple songs of Jagannath temple, Puri. Radhe Krishna — the maha-mantra of Nimbarka Sampradaya is as follows:

Notes

See also

Krishna and Radha in a Pavilion
Lakshmi Narayan
Goloka
Banke Bihari Temple, Vrindavan
Radha Rani Temple, Barsana
Radha Krishna Vivah Sthali, Bhandirvan
Radha Vallabh Temple, Vrindavan

Footnotes

References

Further reading
 Kakar, Sudhir (Jan-June 1985). "Erotic fantasy: the secret passion of Radha and Krishna", Contributions to Indian Sociology (New Series) 19, no.1. pp. 75–94.
 Miller, Barbara Stoller (1982). "The divine duality of Radha and Krishna", in The Divine Consort: Radha and the Goddesses of India, eds. J. S. Hawley and D. M. Wulff. Berkeley: University of California Press. pp. 13–26.
 Goswami, Sri Rupa. Bhakti-Rasamrta-Sindhuh. Vrindaban: Institute of Oriental Philosophy, 1965.
 Ligier, Frédéric; Masson, Annick Le Scoëzec (2016). Les Amours de Râdhâ, Musique et poésie inspirées de miniatures de l'École de Kangra, Paris: Garamond.
 Mishra, Baba (1999). "Radha and her contour in Orissan culture". In Orissan history, culture and archaeology. In Felicitation of Prof. P.K. Mishra. Ed. by S. Pradhan. (Reconstructing Indian History & Culture 16). New Delhi. pp. 243–259.
 
 Prabhupada, A. C. Bhaktivedanta Swami. Krsna: The Supreme Personality of Godhead. [A Summary Study of Srila Vyasadeva's Srimad-Bhagavatam, Tenth Canto.] Los Angeles: Bhaktivedanta Trust, 1970. 2 vols.
 
 Wilson, Frances, ed. The Love of Krishna: The Krsnakarnamarta of Lilasuka Bilvamangala. Philadelphia: University of Pennsylvania Press, 1975.
 Wulff, D. M. The Divine Consort: Radha and the Goddesses of India, Berkeley: University of California Press. 1982

External links
Shri Radha Damodar Temple, Vrindavan
Shree Radha Damodar Temple, Junagadh
Shri Radha Raas Bihari Ashtsakhi Temple, Vrindavan
Shri Maan Mandir (Maan Garh), Barsana

Hindu deities
Swaminarayan Sampradaya
Gaudiya Vaishnavism
Forms of Krishna
Gender and Hinduism
Vaishnavism
Krishna
Hindu given names